Reed Birney (born September 11, 1954) is an American actor. Birney is known for his performances on stage and screen often acting on and off Broadway. Birney gained acclaim in 2016 for his role in The Humans winning the Tony Award for Best Featured Actor in a Play. He was also nominated previously in the same category for his performance in Casa Valentina in 2014. 

He starred in the films Mass (2021), and The Menu (2022). He is also known for his recurring roles in Gossip Girl (2007–2009), House of Cards (2013–2017), The Blacklist (2014–2015), and Home Before Dark (2021–2022). He has also acted in The Americans, The Handmaid's Tale, and Succession.

Career
Birney attended the Boston University College of Fine Arts for two years. After moving to New York City, he attended classes sponsored by the National Academy of Television Arts and Sciences.

Birney appeared Off-Broadway at Playwrights Horizons in 1976 in Gemini by Albert Innaurato. He has appeared in many plays Off-Broadway since, including Bug (2004) and Circle Mirror Transformation (2009).

He has performed on Broadway in Casa Valentina (2014) and The Humans. He appeared in the Annie Baker adaptation of Uncle Vanya at the Soho Rep in 2012. Charles Isherwood in his review for The New York Times wrote: "The indispensable Reed Birney is as vitally moving a Vanya as I’ve yet to see..." He was nominated for the Drama Desk Award, Outstanding Actor in a Play, for Uncle Vanya.

He won the 2016 Tony Award, Best Performance by an Actor in a Featured Role in a Play, for The Humans; the 2014 Drama Desk Award, Outstanding Featured Actor in a Play, for Casa Valentina; and the 2010 Obie Award, Performance, for Circle Mirror Transformation. He received a Special Drama Desk Award in 2011, honoring his career.

He appeared off-Broadway in the play by Tracy Letts, Man from Nebraska, which opened in January 2017 in previews at the Second Stage Theatre.  From May to October 2017, he starred as O'Brien in the Broadway production of 1984 at the Hudson Theatre.

His television performances include Matthew Lester in Kane & Abel, Mr. Prescott on Gossip Girl, Donald Blythe on the Netflix series House of Cards, Tom Connolly in The Blacklist and Dr. Adamson on Titans. He also appeared in Hulu's adaptation of Margaret Atwood's The Handmaid's Tale as Lieutenant Stans.

His movie roles included Louie in Four Friends (1981), the Merchant Prince in A Perfect Murder (1998), Governor Willis in Morning Glory (2010), J. Whitman in The 40-Year-Old Version, Pa in The Hunt (both 2020), Peter Bloom in Strawberry Mansion, and Richard in Mass (both 2021).

Birney is an adjunct assistant professor at Columbia University.

Personal life
He is married to actress Constance Shulman, who appears in Orange is the New Black, and they have two children together. Their daughter Gus Birney is also an actor, as is their son, Ephraim.

Filmography

Film

Television

Awards and nominations

References

External links

 
 

1954 births
American male stage actors
American male film actors
American male television actors
Boston University College of Fine Arts alumni
Drama Desk Award winners
Living people
Male actors from Virginia
Tony Award winners